The 2022 United States Tri-Nation Series was the twelfth round of the 2019–2023 ICC Cricket World Cup League 2, that took place in the United States in May and June 2022. It was a tri-nation series between Scotland, the United Arab Emirates and the United States cricket teams, with the matches played as One Day International (ODI) fixtures. The ICC Cricket World Cup League 2 forms part of the qualification pathway to the 2023 Cricket World Cup. In April 2022, USA Cricket confirmed all the fixtures for the series, with all the matches taking place at the Moosa Stadium in Pearland.

Originally the series was scheduled to take place in April 2020. The fixtures were initially confirmed on 5 February 2020, with all the matches scheduled to take place at the Central Broward Regional Park in Lauderhill. However, on 13 March 2020, the series was postponed due to the COVID-19 pandemic and increased travel restrictions to the United States. In December 2020, the ICC announced the rescheduled dates for the series.

Prior to the penultimate match of the series, Scotland's captain Kyle Coetzer announced that he would step down as the team captain following the conclusion of Scotland's match against the United Arab Emirates.

Squads

Brad Currie was also named in Scotland's squad as a travelling reserve player. Jaskaran Malhotra was ruled out of the USA's squad after suffering a fracture in his hand, with Saiteja Mukkamalla named as his replacement.

Fixtures

1st ODI

2nd ODI

3rd ODI

4th ODI

5th ODI

6th ODI

References

External links
 Series home at ESPN Cricinfo

2022 in American cricket
2022 in Emirati cricket
2022 in Scottish cricket
International cricket competitions in 2022
United States
United States Tri-Nation Series
United States Tri-Nation Series
Cricket events postponed due to the COVID-19 pandemic